Rod Thomas (stage name Bright Light Bright Light) is a Welsh independent singer-songwriter, based in New York. Bright Light Bright Light incorporates many elements of nu-disco into his music, also branching into synthpop, dance and house music. Two of his albums have reached the top 20 on the UK Independent Albums Chart.

Career

1982-2009: Early years 

Thomas grew up in a small village near Neath, Wales, and learned several instruments as a child, including piano. His first forays into music were more folk-based, led by acoustic guitar with, due to a lack of equipment, minimal beats around it. Thomas later stated his dalliance with folk was due to his lack of knowledge with production techniques, and that he was always drawn to house and synthpop. He left Wales to take a place reading English literature and creative writing at Warwick University, then made the move to London. In London he set up a studio at home, and spent rush hours busking busy London tube stations. In 2009 he sent demo tracks to American producer Boom Bip, resulting in Thomas being invited to Los Angeles for two weeks to collaborate on tracks. Thomas stated Boom Bip's production on the song "A New Word to Say" helped him find "my sound".

2010-present : Bright Light Bright Light
Thomas released "Love Part II", his first single under the name Bright Light Bright Light, in 2010 on the Popjustice Hi-Fi label. Thomas chose the name Bright Light Bright Light from a quote spoken by the character Gizmo in the 1984 movie Gremlins. 2010 also saw him tour as the support act for Ellie Goulding. The singles "Disco Moment" and "Feel It" followed in 2011 and 2012, and, after appearances at Bestival in the UK and South by South West in the US, he released his debut album Make Me Believe in Hope in 2012.

The album tracks on Make Me Believe in Hope were co-written and produced by Rod Thomas, The Invisible Men and Andy Chatterley. The album features several collaborations, including vocals from Scissor Sisters' guitarist Del Marquis on the track "Cry at Films". Make Me Believe in Hope was released in the UK on 4 June 2012 through independent label Aztec Records, and the album received generally positive reviews from music critics and bloggers, with The Fly magazine noting the album among releases that just missed its annual top 50. The album was voted at number 4 in The Guardian's Reader Choice: Best Albums of 2012.
The single "Disco Moment", from the album, was placed on the BBC Radio 1 play list. In June 2012 the album made the final shortlist for the annual Welsh Music Prize, but lost to Future of the Left. 2012 also saw Bright Light Bright Light support Scissor Sisters on four venues of their UK tour.

In 2013, the EP In Your Care was released; followed by "I Wish We Were Leaving", a second single from Thomas' second album, featuring Elton John. Following the latter's release, Thomas toured with Elton John during summer 2014. Bright Light Bright Light's second album Life is Easy was released in the UK on 7 July 2014, charting at No. 139, and was preceded by the single "I Believe" on 29 June. Thomas spent most of 2014 and 2015 touring as the opening act for Elton John in the US, Canada, UK, Europe and Russia, playing 55 shows. He ended 2015 with a short US tour opening for John Grant.

In 2016, Choreography was released, entering the UK Album Chart at No. 72, the Independent Album Breakers chart at No. 1, and the US Billboard Dance / Electronic Album Chart at No. 12. The album features guest appearances by Elton John, Alan Cumming, all Scissor Sisters members and Mykal Kilgore. All guests feature on the album's lead single "All in the Name", which was unveiled in a live performance on Graham Norton's BBC TV show with Elton John on stage with him. The song was added to the Radio 2 B-list playlist and scored Thomas his widest-reaching single to date.

Aside from creating his own music, Thomas runs a daytime dance party in New York (which transfers to London when he is touring) called Romy & Michele's Saturday Afternoon Tea Dance, named after "Romy & Michele's High School Reunion", one of his favourite films. The party takes place both in Brooklyn and at Club Cumming, a bar in Manhattan's East Village run by Alan Cumming, who stars in the film that inspired the event.

In 2017 Thomas appeared as an extra in one of his favourite TV series, The League of Gentlemen, in the first episode of their three-part TV return, "Return to Royston Vasey", as a job-seeker in Pauline's restart class. This marked his second time working with actor, director and writer Mark Gatiss, after composing the theme tune for Mark's BBC4 series Queers, created as part of the BBC's cycle "Gay Britannia", to mark the 50th anniversary of the passing of the Sexual Offences Act 1967. The show features interviews with gay characters at the margins of the community. It was broadcast by BBC America in collaboration with AMC Networks.

In 2019 he was picked as the opening act for Cher's European tour, playing nine shows across Germany, Netherlands, Belgium, Denmark and Sweden.

Thomas provided the vocals for the animated intro to Murder by Numbers, released March 5, 2020. Later that month, he released "This Was My House", featuring Madonna's backing singers Niki Haris and Donna De Lory and produced by Initial Talk, as the first song from his fourth album Fun City. The song was described as "a perfect disco song" by Paper Magazine, written about how the LGBTQ+ community's safe spaces have been under attack in recent times, and how, despite the upsurge in anti-LGBTQ+ and xenophobic rhetoric, everybody deserves to feel safe in the place they call home.

Fun City was a number 1 UK Dance Album hit on its release in September 2020 receiving widespread critical acclaim, featuring a slew of LGBTQ+ talent adding their vocals: Brendan Maclean, Jake Shears, Andy Bell of Erasure, Sam Sparro, Caveboy, Niki & Donna, KAYE, The Illustrious Blacks, Big Dipper, Mark Gatiss adding a spoken word piece, and Justin Vivian Bond.

In November 2020, Bright Light Bright Light released a duet with alt-cabaret star Justin Vivian Bond, "Saying Goodbye Is Exhausting". The haunting ballad captures grief in the LGBTQ+ community. It was "released to raise some hope, money and awareness for Trans Awareness Week and World AIDS Day 2020, the official day of release of the EP."

In March 2023, Bright Light Bright Light unveil "Sweet Release" as the lead single from his upcoming fifth studio album.

Personal life
Thomas has described himself both as "gay" and as "queer".

Discography

Studio Albums

Live Albums

Extended plays

Singles

References

Welsh rock singers
Welsh male singer-songwriters
21st-century Welsh male singers
Synth-pop singers
Welsh gay musicians
People from Neath
Welsh LGBT songwriters
Welsh LGBT singers
Gay singers
Gay songwriters
Nu-disco musicians
Living people
20th-century Welsh LGBT people
21st-century Welsh LGBT people
Queer men
Queer singers
Queer songwriters
1982 births